Verdiana Verardi (born 16 December 1987) is an Italian former professional tennis player.

Verardi has career-high WTA rankings of 358 in singles, achieved on 15 June 2009, and 287 in doubles, set on 7 May 2007. She won four singles and ten doubles titles on the ITF Women's Circuit.

In 2005, she played for Pland the Mediterranean Games in Almería (Spain) where she won the bronze medal in women's doubles.

She retired from tennis due to a serious shoulder injury and personal issues.

ITF Circuit finals

Singles: 11 (4 titles, 7 runner–ups)

Doubles: 18 (10 titles, 8 runner–ups)

References

External links
 
 

1987 births
Living people
Italian female tennis players
Mediterranean Games bronze medalists for Italy
Mediterranean Games medalists in tennis
Competitors at the 2005 Mediterranean Games
21st-century Italian women